Spinrad is a surname. Notable people with the surname include:

 Hyron Spinrad (1934–2015), American astronomer
 Norman Spinrad (born 1940), American science fiction writer, essayist, and critic
 Rick Spinrad, American oceanographer and government official
 Robert Spinrad (1932–2009), American computer pioneer